The 2010 MSBL season was the 22nd season of the Men's State Basketball League (SBL). The regular season began on Friday 12 March and ended on Saturday 17 July. The finals began on Saturday 24 July and ended on Saturday 21 August, when the Willetton Tigers defeated the Lakeside Lightning in the MSBL Grand Final.

Regular season
The regular season began on Friday 12 March and ended on Saturday 17 July after 19 rounds of competition.

Standings

Finals
The finals began on Saturday 24 July and ended on Saturday 21 August with the MSBL Grand Final.

Bracket

Awards

Player of the Week

Statistics leaders

Regular season
 Most Valuable Player: Ryan Zamroz (Geraldton Buccaneers)
 Coach of the Year: Andy Stewart (Lakeside Lightning)
 Most Improved Player: Seb Salinas (Wanneroo Wolves)
 All-Star Five:
 PG: Joel Wagner (Perth Redbacks)
 SG: Ryan Zamroz (Geraldton Buccaneers)
 SF: Cameron Tovey (Willetton Tigers)
 PF: Adrian Majstrovich (Kalamunda Eastern Suns)
 C: Jarrad Prue (Lakeside Lightning)

Finals
 Grand Final MVP: Cameron Tovey (Willetton Tigers)

References

External links
 2010 fixtures
 April Player & Coach of the Month
 May Player & Coach of the Month
 June Player & Coach of the Month

2010
2009–10 in Australian basketball
2010–11 in Australian basketball